QCR Holdings, Inc., through its subsidiaries, provides commercial and consumer banking, and trust and asset management services for the Quad City and Cedar Rapids communities. QCR Holdings, Inc. was founded in 1993 and is headquartered in Moline, Illinois.

About
QCR Holdings, Inc. is a multi-bank holding company headquartered in Moline, Illinois that serves the Quad Cities and Cedar Rapids communities through its wholly owned subsidiary banks. The company also engages in commercial leasing through a subsidiary company in Milwaukee, Wisconsin.:

Subsidiary Banks
The subsidiary banks of QCR Holdings include:
 Quad City Bank and Trust - Based in Bettendorf, Iowa - Commenced operations in 1994
 Cedar Rapids Bank and Trust - Based in Cedar Rapids, Iowa - Commenced operations in 2001

QCR Holdings signed an agreement to sell its Milwaukee subsidiary, First Wisconsin Bank & Trust, to National Bancshares, Inc.  near the end of 2008. First Wisconsin commenced operations in 2006.

QCR Holdings announced an agreement to sell its Rockford subsidiary, Rockford Bank and Trust, to Heartland Financial USA, Inc. subsidiary Illinois Bank & Trust on August 13, 2019. The sale closed on November 30, 2019 and the bank's systems conversion occurred on February 7, 2020.

In 2022, QCR Holdings acquired Guaranty Federal Bancshares.

References

External links
 Quad City Bank and Trust
 Cedar Rapids Bank and Trust

Financial services companies of the United States
Companies based in the Quad Cities
Companies based in Rock Island County, Illinois
Companies listed on the Nasdaq
Moline, Illinois
Financial services companies established in 1993
1993 establishments in Illinois
1993 establishments in the United States
Companies established in 1993